Teresa Folga-Theodoropoulos (born 15 October 1966) is a retired Polish rhythmic gymnast. Miss Olympic Village 1988.

She competed for Poland in the rhythmic gymnastics all-around competition at the 1988 Olympic Games in Seoul, placing 7th overall.

References

External links 
 Teresa Folga at Sports-Reference.com

1966 births
Living people
Polish rhythmic gymnasts
Gymnasts at the 1988 Summer Olympics
Olympic gymnasts of Poland
Sportspeople from Kraków